Miss Universe Ireland 2011 was held on 16 June 2011 in the Abbey Theatre in Dublin. There was county pageants from 29 January to 23 May. The winner represented Ireland at Miss Universe 2011.

Results

Special Awards

Miss Photogenic  - Natasha Shafai (Belfast)
Miss Congeniality  - Kirsten Haugh (North Dublin)
Miss Fashion  - Lydia Bowers (Dublin)
Miss Internet  - Aoifa Lenon  (Galway)

Contestants

External links
Official Website
Offiacial Bebo's Page

Miss Universe Ireland	
2011 in Ireland